Cimișlia is a town located in the southern part of Moldova situated on the banks of the Cogâlnic River,  between the capital of Chișinău and the autonomous territorial unit of Gagauzia. Cimişlia had a population of 11,997 according to the 2014 census. The town is also the seat/administrative center of Cimișlia District. It also administers three villages s follows: Bogdanovca Nouă, Bogdanovca Veche, and Dimitrovca.

History 

The first written mention of Cimişlia dates from 4 July 1620, when the savant Vladimir Nicu explained that a local legend had given the town its name from an unknown origin word meaning "wealth". The priest Iacob Iusipescu, who made the first attempt at a written history of Cimişlia in 1874, explained that in fact it was a word of unknown origin, but cimiş was the name given to construction workers and bricklayers at that time, used by Romanian and Tatar alike.

The basis for the name might also lie in a bucolic legend of lovers, Cimiş şi Lia (Cimiş and Lia), for whom jewels appeared, birds sang, and springs appeared from the earth.

In fact, the reality of the locale is much harsher. Although in 1827 Cimişlia became an administrative center, many of its residents died of a plague and there was need of a special cemetery in the southeast part of town. Situated on the steppe of Budjak, by the Cogâlnic river, the city has often suffered from the droughts typical of the area. Dimitrie Cantemir, referring to this river in his work Descriptio Moldaviae, says "...one could say that it doesn't arise from a spring: it is only full after the rains of autumn and only then can one call it even a rivulet. All summer it is dry..." This would apply as well in our time.

In 1840 the locality received a statute as a market town. Its first school opened in 1844, and in 1885 the "hospital" of Zemstva (treating both people and animals). Between the two World Wars, (1918–1940), Cimişlia formed part of Tighina County or Ținutul Nistru; later, as part of the Soviet Union, it became a district center.

Location
Cimişlia is in Raionul Cimişlia, Moldova, on the banks of the river Cogâlnic.

Economy
The economy consists mainly of an agro-industrial complex with a well-developed network of manufacturing agricultural products, including meat, dairy, tree-fruit, and grain farming, as well as winemaking.

The Cimişlia railroad station, which takes advantage of the broad network of links toward the warehouses of the industrial and commercial companies of the city, is located in the village Mihailovka at a distance of 12 km.

Mineral resources
This deposit is of interest for geological correlations and paleogeographic reconstruction. It has been proposed that it become a scientific reserve.

Notable people 

 Iurie Leancă, former Prime Minister of Moldova between 2013 and 2015, former Liberal Democratic Party (PLDM) politician, current European People's Party (PPEM) leader
 Alexandru Leancă, actor
 Gheorghe Șalaru, Liberal Party (PL) politician, former Minister of Environment, and historian

Gallery

International relations

Twin towns – Sister cities 
Cimișlia is twinned with:

  Câmpina, Romania
  Gmina Rokiciny, Poland
  Hârlău, Romania
  Huși, Romania
  Nowogród Bobrzański, Poland
  Vălenii de Munte, Romania
  Vileyka, Belarus

References

External links
 http://cimislia.md

Cities and towns in Moldova
Bendersky Uyezd
Cimișlia District